Ismat al-Doulah (19th-century) was a daughter of shah Naser al-Din Shah Qajar of Persia (r. 1848–1896). 

She was the daughter of Taj al-Dawlah.

She married Dost Mohammad Khan Muir al-Mamalek. 

She is known as the first Iranian woman to learn how to play a piano. She was also known as a collector.

References

 

19th-century births
19th-century deaths
19th-century Iranian women